Machesney Park Mall was a shopping center in Machesney Park, Illinois, a village in the Rockford, Illinois metropolitan area. Since its opening, the mall has greatly declined. The entire enclosed portion of the mall was closed, with the south wing becoming retail space. Other parts of the mall have become retail space as well. A large portion of the mall was transformed into two separate stores, Burlington Coat Factory and Big Lots, in an effort to transform the mall into a shopping plaza.

History
The mall was built on part of the site of the former Machesney Airport, which closed in 1974, by Melvin Simon and Associates (now Simon Property Group). It opened in 1978 with four anchor stores: JCPenney, Prange's, and Prange Way, with other additional stores. Shortly after the opening, Kohl's was added as the fourth anchor store at the mall.

In 1990, the Prange Way location at the mall was closed.

Stores
The original anchor stores of Machesney Park Mall were JCPenney and H.C. Prange, later Younkers, then Bergner's. Prange Way, which later became Phar-Mor, and Kohl's were added in the 1980s.

A Burlington Coat Factory store opened in the mall in September 2009. Despite announcement from JCPenney that it would close all of its outlet stores, representatives of the chain said that the Machesney Park store would remain open through 2012.

On October 11, 2016, The Bon-Ton Stores announced that Bergner's would be closing on January 31, 2017.

Renovations
Since being acquired by Rubloff Development Group in December 2003, the mall has been undergoing internal demolition in preparation for redevelopment. Practice Velocity, a medical software and billing company, moved into the former Kohl's in late 2013. On July 18, 2018 it was announced that PCI Pharma Services would move into the vacant JCPenney store.

References

External links
Dead Malls dot Com: Features: Machesney Park Mall

Shopping malls established in 1978
Shopping malls in Illinois
Economy of Rockford, Illinois
Buildings and structures in Winnebago County, Illinois
Tourist attractions in Winnebago County, Illinois